Australian Bushland Symphony is a 1949 documentary directed by Ken G. Hall. It deals with Australian wild life in its natural state.

Hall had previously used the concept of a "bushland symphony" in his 1932 film, On Our Selection.

The film sold to US television. The documentary is also referred to as "Bushland Symphony".

References

External links
Australian Bushland Symphony at IMDb
Australian Bushland Symphony at National Film and Sound Archive

Australian documentary films